The 2006 Haarlem Baseball Week was an international baseball competition held at the Pim Mulier Stadium in Haarlem, the Netherlands from July 21–30, 2006. It was the 23rd edition of the tournament and featured teams from China, Chinese Taipei, Cuba, Japan, Netherlands and United States.

In the end the team from the Netherlands won their second straight tournament title.

Group stage

Standings

 Chinese Taipei is the official IBAF designation for the team representing the state officially referred to as the Republic of China, more commonly known as Taiwan. (See also political status of Taiwan for details.)

Game results

Final

Final standings

Tournament awards

References

External links
Official Website

2006 in baseball